This is a list of communes of Luxembourg by population. Towns are given in italics.

See also
 List of towns in Luxembourg by population
 List of quarters of Luxembourg City by population
 List of communes of Luxembourg by area
 List of communes of Luxembourg by highest point
 List of communes of Luxembourg by lowest point
 List of communes of Luxembourg by population density

References

Population